Mark Killilea Jnr (5 September 1939 – 31 December 2018) was a farmer, auctioneer and agricultural contractor who served as an Irish Fianna Fáil politician. In a 30-year political career, served as a Teachta Dála (TD) and Member of the European Parliament (MEP) and also as a Senator.

Biography 
Mark Killilea was born in Tuam, County Galway in 1939. He married Anne Severs in 1966. His father Mark Killilea Snr was a Fianna Fáil TD and a founder-member of the party. Killilea Jnr was educated locally and first held political office in August 1969, when he was elected to Seanad Éireann on the Labour Panel and re-elected in 1973. He failed to be elected to Dáil Éireann on his first attempt when he stood in Galway North-East at the 1973 general election, but at the 1977 general election he won a seat in the new Galway East constituency. The election was a landslide for Fianna Fáil and in particular showed the popularity of the party leader Jack Lynch.

However, after just two years Lynch's fortunes had changed. Along with Jackie Fahey, Tom McEllistrim, Seán Doherty and Albert Reynolds, Killilea was one of the so-called "gang of five" that lobbied the parliamentary party for support for Charles Haughey in the event of the retirement of Lynch's retirement. This group was determined that the leadership should not pass to George Colley, Lynch's apparent successor. Haughey went on to win the leadership contest and become Taoiseach in December 1979.

Killilea's loyalty to Haughey was rewarded by his being appointed Minister of State at the Department of Posts and Telegraphs after Haughey became Taoiseach. He held this position until Fianna Fáil's defeat at the 1981 general election—at which, after changes in constituency boundaries, he switched to the Galway West constituency. 

He lost his Dáil seat there at the February 1982 general election, but was elected to the Seanad where he served until 1987. After Ray MacSharry retired from the European Parliament in 1987, Killilea was appointed as his replacement in the Connacht–Ulster constituency. Killilea held the seat at the 1989 and 1994 European Parliament elections, and was elected as Quaestor by his fellow MEPs in 1996. He retired from politics at the 1999 European Parliament election.

Untold Secrets allegations
In 2021, an Irish documentary, Untold Secrets, reported the testimony of Anne Silke, a survivor of the Tuam Mother and Baby Home, that she had been physically assaulted by Killilea Jnr on several occasions while in the foster care of his parents Mark Killilea Snr and his wife. She said several instances saw Killilea Jnr lash her with a horsewhip until she was bloody. Donagh Killilea, a son of Killlilea Jnr said that the allegations by Silke were "unverified" and "inaccurate".

References

External links

1939 births
2018 deaths
Child abuse in the Republic of Ireland
Fianna Fáil MEPs
Fianna Fáil senators
Fianna Fáil TDs
Irish farmers
Local councillors in County Galway
Members of the 12th Seanad
Members of the 13th Seanad
Members of the 16th Seanad
Members of the 17th Seanad
Members of the 21st Dáil
Members of the 22nd Dáil
MEPs for the Republic of Ireland 1984–1989
MEPs for the Republic of Ireland 1989–1994
MEPs for the Republic of Ireland 1994–1999
Ministers of State of the 21st Dáil
People educated at St Jarlath's College
People from Tuam
Politicians from County Galway